Deer Creek Township is one of twelve townships in Allen County, Kansas, United States. As of the 2010 census, its population was 129.

Geography
According to the USGS, it contains one cemetery, Pleasant Valley.

References
 USGS Geographic Names Information System (GNIS)

External links
 US-Counties.com
 City-Data.com

Townships in Allen County, Kansas
Townships in Kansas